Gueltet Sidi Saâd District is a district of Laghouat Province, Algeria.

Municipalities
It is divided into 3 municipalities:
 Gueltat Sidi Saad
 Aïn Sidi Ali
El Beidha.

References

Districts of Laghouat Province